Cheng Shin Rubber Industry Co. is a Taiwanese and the ninth largest tire company in the world. Established in 1967, in Yuanlin City, Changhua County, Taiwan, by Luo Jye. Maxxis Tyres  and CST tires are wholly owned subsidiaries of Cheng Shin.

The company began as a producer of bicycle tyres and has since expanded into other types of tyres, including for motor vehicles. In 2015 Cheng Shin had worldwide revenue of over $3.85 billion.

See also
 List of companies of Taiwan

References

1967 establishments in Taiwan
Automotive companies established in 1967
Cycle parts manufacturers
Taiwanese brands
Tire manufacturers of Taiwan